The National Council to Prevent Discrimination (CONAPRED) is a Mexican government agency created in 2003 by Federal Law to Prevent and Eliminate Discrimination and to promote policies and measures to contribute to the cultural and social development and progress in social inclusion and guarantee the right to equality.

Scope
The National Council to Prevent Discrimination is the independent governing body within the Secretariat of the Interior tasked with promoting policies and measures to contribute to the cultural and social development and progress in social inclusion and guarantee the right to equality, which is the first of the fundamental rights in the Constitution of Mexico.

The council is responsible for receiving and resolving complaints of alleged discriminatory acts committed by private individuals or federal authorities in the exercise of their functions. The council also takes actions to protect all citizens from "exclusion based on ethnic or national origin, sex, age, disability, social or economic status, health, pregnancy, language, religion, opinions, sexual orientation, marital status, or any other to prevent or defeat the recognition or exercise of rights and real equality of opportunity for people".

History
The National Council to Prevent Discrimination created by Federal Law to Prevent and Eliminate Discrimination, was adopted on 29 April 2003, and published in the Official Journal of the Federation (DOF) on 11 June of that year. The latest amendment to the law was published in the Journal on 27 November 2007.

Together with the Secretariat of Social Development (SEDESOL), the council conducted a National Survey on Discrimination in 2005 to systematically collect information on the state of intolerance in Mexico. It was the first survey of its kind in the country.

Governance

Board of Governors
The board of governors serves as the governing body of the council and includes representatives of these entities:

Presidents
Presidents of the National Council to Prevent Discrimination, who also chair the Board of Governors, is appointed by the head of the Mexican Federal Government. Presidents of the council have included:
 Gilberto Rincón Gallardo
 11 July 2003 - 30 August 2008
 Perla Patricia Bustamante Corona
 11 December 2008 - 30 November 2009
 Ricardo Antonio Bucio Mujica
 1 December 2009 - December 2015
Alexandra Haas Pacuic
December 2015 – Present day

References

External links
 

Executive branch of the government of Mexico
Government agencies established in 2003
2003 in Mexico
2003 establishments in Mexico